Lord of Lords may refer to:
A title of God used in Deuteronomy 10:17 and Psalm 136:3
A title of Jesus used in 1 Timothy 6:15, Revelation 17:14, and Revelation 19:16
A title of Bahá'u'lláh
Overlord
Lord of Lords (album), a 1972 album by Alice Coltrane

See also
King of Kings